Wyatt, Tarrant & Combs LLP traces its roots back more than 200 years to 1812, when Alexander Scott Bullitt opened his law practice. Wyatt has changed significantly since those frontier days and is now a full-service regional law firm with offices in Louisville and Lexington, Kentucky; New Albany, Indiana; and Memphis and Nashville, Tennessee.

Notable lawyers and alumni
Wilson W. Wyatt, former Lieutenant Governor of Kentucky and Mayor of Louisville, Kentucky
Bert T. Combs, former Governor of Kentucky
Gordon B. Davidson, former Managing Partner at Wyatt, Tarrant & Combs and attorney for the "Louisville Sponsoring Group," a collaboration of business leaders who provided the funding for Muhammad Ali's launch into professional boxing 
 Dr. Benjamin Hooks, American civil rights leader and former executive director of the National Association for the Advancement of Colored People (NAACP)
Frank W. Burke, former Mayor of Louisville, Kentucky

References

External links
Official Website

Companies based in Louisville, Kentucky
Law firms established in 1812
Law firms based in Kentucky
1812 establishments in Kentucky